Jaanus Nõmmsalu (born 19 January 1981) is a former Estonian volleyball player. He was a member of the Estonian national team from 1999 to 2013 and has represented his country at the 2009 and 2011 European Volleyball Championships. Nõmmsalu started his professional career in hometown club ESS Falck Pärnu. He has also played in France, Austria, Greece, Czech Republic and Russia.

Sporting achievements

Clubs
MEVZA Cup
  2005/2006 – with Aon hotVolleys Vienna

Baltic League
  2007/2008 – with Pere Leib Tartu
  2008/2009 – with Selver Tallinn
  2010/2011 – with Pärnu
  2012/2013 – with TTÜ
  2015/2016 – with Pärnu

National championship
 1998/1999  Estonian Championship, with ESS Pärnu
 1999/2000  Estonian Championship, with ESS Pärnu
 2000/2001  Estonian Championship, with ESS Pärnu
 2001/2002  Estonian Championship, with ESS Pärnu
 2002/2003  Estonian Championship, with ESS Pärnu
 2003/2004  Estonian Championship, with ESS Falck Pärnu
 2007/2008  Estonian Championship, with Pere Leib Tartu
 2008/2009  Estonian Championship, with Selver Tallinn
 2010/2011  Estonian Championship, with Pärnu
 2012/2013  Estonian Championship, with TTÜ
 2014/2015  Estonian Championship, with Pärnu
 2015/2016  Estonian Championship, with Pärnu

National cup
 1998/1999  Estonian Cup 1998, with ESS Pärnu
 1999/2000  Estonian Cup 1999, with ESS Pärnu
 2000/2001  Estonian Cup 2000, with ESS Pärnu
 2001/2002  Estonian Cup 2001, with ESS Pärnu
 2002/2003  Estonian Cup 2002, with ESS Pärnu
 2003/2004  Estonian Cup 2003, with ESS Falck Pärnu
 2005/2006  Austrian Cup 2006, with Aon hotVolleys Vienna
 2010/2011  Estonian Cup 2010, with Pärnu
 2013/2014  Estonian Cup 2013, with TTÜ
 2014/2015  Estonian Cup 2014, with Pärnu
 2015/2016  Estonian Cup 2015, with Pärnu

References

External links
 Player profile on the FIVB official site
 Player profile on TTÜ official site

1981 births
Living people
Sportspeople from Pärnu
Estonian men's volleyball players
Estonian expatriate volleyball players
Estonian expatriate sportspeople in France
Expatriate volleyball players in France
Estonian expatriate sportspeople in Austria
Expatriate volleyball players in Austria
Estonian expatriate sportspeople in Greece
Expatriate volleyball players in Greece
Estonian expatriate sportspeople in the Czech Republic
Expatriate volleyball players in the Czech Republic
Estonian expatriate sportspeople in Russia
Expatriate volleyball players in Russia